A Agualada is a parish in the Spanish municipality of Coristanco, Galicia.

External links
Webpage at the Coristanco website 

Coristanco
Parishes of Galicia (Spain)